Collideøscope is the fourth studio album by American rock band Living Colour. Released on October 7, 2003, it was their first studio album in eight years. Living Colour began recording Collideøscope in 2001; many of the songs are about the September 11 attacks.

The album contains cover versions of AC/DC's "Back in Black" and The Beatles' "Tomorrow Never Knows". While critically praised, Collideøscope is the band's first album that failed to chart.

A version of "Sacred Ground" previously appeared on their 1995 compilation album  Pride.

Critical reception
Exclaim! wrote that "as always, variety is the order of the day with these talented musicians, with the band jumping from traditional hard rock, to groovy near-funk (bleh) to a reggae-tinged number, experimental soundscapes, etc." The Chicago Tribune wrote: "As if time stood still, the album packs wallop with its aggressive sonic bursts and acute perspective on a post-9/11 society in flux."

Track listing

Personnel
Living Colour
 Corey Glover – lead vocals
 Vernon Reid – guitars, acoustic guitar, backing vocals, sound design, sample munging
 Doug Wimbish – bass, backing vocals, sound design, ambience, guitars (3), drums (10), drum programming (5)
 Will Calhoun – drums, wave drum, indigenous water drum, samples, loops, tabla, keyboard sonics, electronic percussion
Additional personnel
David Sancious - keyboards (9)

References

2003 albums
Living Colour albums
Sanctuary Records albums
Heavy metal albums by American artists